Catherine Lalumière (born 3 August 1935 in Rennes) is a French politician of the Radical Party of the Left.

Before her political career, she lectured on public law at the University of Rennes and Paris 1 Panthéon-Sorbonne University. She began a foray into politics in 1981 as Minister of Consumption in the cabinet of Pierre Mauroy, and held several offices throughout the 1980s.

She served as Secretary General of the Council of Europe from 1989 to 1994, and became a member of the European Parliament in 1994, re-elected in 1999 until 2004.

She has been Vice-President of the International European Movement where she chaired the Working Group on Enlargement.

Lalumière is currently President of the Maison de l'Europe de Paris.

References

1935 births
Living people
Politicians from Rennes
Council of Europe Secretaries-General
Radical Party of the Left politicians
Radical Party (France) MEPs
MEPs for France 1994–1999
MEPs for France 1999–2004
20th-century women MEPs for France
21st-century women MEPs for France
Women government ministers of France
Officiers of the Légion d'honneur